Aram Karam (born 1926) was one of the first great Iraqi footballers, who earned a reputation for scoring goals from apparently impossible long-range situations. He was an ethnic Assyrian and Christian.

He was a son of a Levy soldier from Habbaniya. Aram was a striker capable of having the ball in the back of the net within a blink of an eye. After playing for various teams on RAF Hinaidi in Baghdad from 1936 in his youth, he joined Arsenal Sports Club Habbaniya in 1943 and later played for the C.C. Team and founded RAF Levy Civilian of Habbaniya.

In 1951, Aram was one of 16 players to be selected to play for Iraq’s first ever national team. He missed Iraq’s first international game against Turkey in Izmir on 6 May, which ended 7-0 to the hosts, but competed in the second game six days later against Ankara Select. Aram proved to be a valuable player on the day as he scored Iraq’s first goal and ended the game with a hat-trick but was unable to prevent a 7-5 defeat.

The next year, he joined Sharakat Nafat Al-Iraq in Kirkuk. Aram was not only the captain of the team but also the head coach. In 1954, the team won the Northern Iraqi Championship and also won 6 consecutive Middle East Oil Companies Championships under his leadership. In 1960 Aram retired and became head of sports at the club while also helping the Iraqi national team.

Aside from football, the forward also won six consecutive tennis titles in the Persian Gulf Tennis Championships.

References

External links
 Assyrian American Association of Modesto 

1926 births
Living people
Sportspeople from Baghdad
Iraqi footballers
Iraqi football managers
Assyrian sportspeople
Assyrian footballers
Association football forwards
Iraqi Assyrian people